Nikolaj William Coster-Waldau (born 27 July 1970) is a Danish actor and producer. He graduated from the Danish National School of Performing Arts in Copenhagen in 1993, and had his breakthrough role in Denmark with the film Nightwatch (1994). He played Jaime Lannister in the HBO fantasy drama series Game of Thrones, for which he received two Primetime Emmy Award nominations for Outstanding Supporting Actor in a Drama Series.

Coster-Waldau has appeared in numerous films in his native Denmark and Scandinavia, including Headhunters (2011) and A Thousand Times Good Night (2013). In the U.S, his debut film role was in the war film Black Hawk Down (2001), playing Medal of Honor recipient Gary Gordon. He then played a detective in the short-lived Fox television series New Amsterdam (2008), and appeared in the 2009 Fox television film Virtuality, originally intended as a pilot. He is a UNDP Goodwill Ambassador, drawing public attention to issues such as gender equality and climate change.

Early life
Coster-Waldau was born in Rudkøbing, Denmark, the son of Hanne Søborg Coster, a librarian, and Jørgen Oscar Fritzer Waldau (died 1998). He has spoken in interviews about his father's problems with alcohol, as well as his parents' divorce. He has two older sisters, and was raised mainly by his mother. He grew up in Tybjerg, a small village between Ringsted and Næstved in southern Zealand. Coster-Waldau attended the Danish National School of Theatre and Contemporary Dance (Danish: Statens Teaterskole) from 1989 to 1993.

Career

Early career and breakthrough (1993–2000)
Coster-Waldau made his stage debut as Laertes in Hamlet at the Betty Nansen Theater. His role in the film Nightwatch (1994) brought him fame in his native country. He then went on to play in Simon Staho's Wildside (1998), which he also cowrote, and starred in Danish films such as Misery Harbour (1999). He starred in his first British film Bent (1997).

Transition to United States film and television (2001–2010) 

In 2001, he began his U.S. career in Ridley Scott's Black Hawk Down as Medal of Honor recipient Gary Gordon. Coster-Waldau says "My first U.S. movie was Black Hawk Down and a friend helped me put myself on tape up on the attic over my apartment in Copenhagen. We shipped it out and I got lucky." Coster-Waldau used his success to take roles on both sides of the Atlantic, particularly his native Scandinavia.

He had a leading role in Michael Apted's Enigma and played a villain in the action film My Name is Modesty (based upon the Modesty Blaise comic strip). Scott brought Coster-Waldau back for the 2005 film Kingdom of Heaven. Richard Loncraine cast Coster-Waldau for Wimbledon and Firewall. In 2007, he played John Amsterdam, an immortal New York homicide detective who becomes mortal after finding true love, in the short-lived Fox television series New Amsterdam. As a result of filming that series' pilot, Coster-Waldau obtained his Screen Actors Guild card. He later recalled in a 2015 interview in TV Guide, "Finally getting my SAG card was huge for me...I got so excited I went straight to the SAG online shop and bought four mugs with SAG logo. [I] still have those mugs!"

Mainstream and critical success (2011–present)

From 2011 to 2019, Coster-Waldau played Jaime Lannister in the HBO series Game of Thrones, based on George R. R. Martin's fantasy novel series A Song of Ice and Fire. He commented about the character "What's not to like about Jaime? As an actor I couldn't ask for a better role". For his role, he received several accolades, including Primetime Emmy Award, Screen Actors Guild Award, Critics' Choice Television Award, Saturn Award and People's Choice Award nominations.

In 2011, he starred alongside Sam Shepard in Mateo Gil's feature Blackthorn, which premiered at the Tribeca Film Festival. Later the same year he starred in Morten Tyldum's Headhunters. The film went on to be the highest-grossing Norwegian film of all-time and received very positive reviews including a BAFTA Award nomination for Best Foreign Film. Coster-Waldau starred in the 2013 horror film Mama alongside Jessica Chastain, which then debuted at number one in the US box office and grossed over $140 million worldwide. He went on to play Sykes, a military weapons expert in the science fiction action thriller film Oblivion. That same year, he co-starred with Juliette Binoche in Erik Poppe's drama A Thousand Times Good Night. In 2014, he starred in Susanne Bier's Danish thriller A Second Chance as Andreas, a police officer forced to make a difficult choice. In 2016, Coster-Waldau appeared in the action-fantasy film Gods of Egypt as Horus.

In early 2017, he starred in E.L. Katz's dark comedy Small Crimes which premiered at South by Southwest film festival on 11 March 2017, to positive reviews. Coster-Waldau then appeared in the Danish film 3 Things, a thriller about a prime suspect of a bank robbery who negotiates the terms of his witness protection deal. He starred in Roman Waugh's prison film Shot Caller, which premiered at the Los Angeles Film Festival on 16 June 2017. Since January 2018 he has been the L'Oréal Paris global spokesperson for the company's Men Expert line of products.

In May 2017, it was announced that he starred in Brian De Palma's film Domino. The film was released on 31 May 2019. Later the same year he starred in Suicide Tourist by Jonas Alexander Arnby, which premiered at the Zurich Film Festival. That same year, Coster-Waldau launched a production company named Ill Kippers. He starred in The Silencing, a thriller directed by Robin Pront.

He filmed in secret the movie The Day We Died (Krudttønden) by Ole Christian Madsen. The film is based on events surrounding the 2015 Copenhagen shootings and was originally slated for release for late 2019. It was released in Europe on 3 May 2020. On 7 January 2021, Variety announced that Samuel Goldwyn Films has purchased U.S. distribution rights for the film.

He was to have played Macbeth in 2020, in a production of Shakespeare's tragedy reuniting with Matt Shakman at the Geffen Playhouse. On 15 April 2020, the Geffen Playhouse announced on its blog that its production of Macbeth, among others, had been postponed because of the Covid pandemic.

Personal life 

Although Coster-Waldau is not religious, he was baptized and confirmed as a Lutheran in the Danish National Church during his youth, like the vast majority of Danes, and viewed his confirmation as a big moment in his life when he first identified as becoming an adult.

He married Nukâka, a Greenlandic actress and singer, in 1998 and they live in Copenhagen with their two daughters as well as two dogs. Their daughter Filippa starred in a Danish short film, The Girl and the Dogs, which was shown at the Cannes Film Festival in 2014. Their other daughter, Safina, starred as the main character Simone in the Danish Christmas TV series Theo og Den Magiske Talisman in December 2018. His father-in-law is Josef Motzfeldt, a member of the Parliament of Greenland and former leader of the Community of the People party.

Although his father was a supporter of Arsenal, a trip to a match at the Elland Road ground in the early 1990s persuaded him to become a supporter of Leeds United, and he is a member of the Leeds United Supporters' Trust.
He published a very emotional video to thank Marcelo Bielsa, Leeds head coach in 2020, when the team was finally promoted to the Premier League again after 16 years.

In September 2017, Coster-Waldau signed on to narrate one of the fairytales for GivingTales, the celebrity storytelling app for children and adults alike. He is going to narrate "The Steadfast Tin Soldier", on which he commented, "I am from Denmark and Hans Christian Andersen is part of our culture and I am very proud being part of this project. 'The Steadfast Tin Soldier' is a beautiful love story which we can all relate to."

UNDP ambassadorship and other humanitarian causes
Coster-Waldau has supported the Danish Red Cross since 2003. In 2016, he announced a Game of Thrones campaign-contest in order to support the RED foundation which aims to raise awareness and fight AIDS.

Since September 2016, he has been serving as a UNDP Goodwill Ambassador to raise awareness and support the United Nations' Sustainable Development Goals, an action to end poverty, fight inequality and stop climate change. In 2017 Coster-Waldau partnered with Google, using Street View to document the impact of global warming in Greenland, in order to increase awareness and highlight climate change.
After participating in a female empowerment initiative in Kenya, on the occasion of International Women's Day in 2017, he wrote a pledge calling for all fathers to support gender equality and women's empowerment, including those women who live in extreme poverty and are exposed to practises like child marriage. In September 2017, he was one of the speakers in The Spotlight Initiative, a European Union-United Nations action to eliminate violence against women and girls, after kicking off the women's amateur World Cup. In October 2017, he travelled to the Maldives to report global warming effects, resuming his role as a United Nations Development Program Goodwill Ambassador.

In early 2018, he and several other Danish artists signed a manifesto demanding zero tolerance for sexism, sexual harassment and sexual assault in the Danish film and stage arts industry. In June 2018, he kicked off The Lion's Share fund's launch, an action in which when an advertising campaign uses an image of an animal, the advertiser will donate 0.5% of the paid media spending of that campaign to the fund. In 2019, he travelled to Rwanda to report the progress of the country, and to Peruvian Amazonia on occasion of the Amazon rainforest wildfires to offer insights into the effects of climate change.

Filmography

Film

Television

Theatre

Awards and nominations

References

External links

 

1970 births
Living people
20th-century Danish male actors
21st-century Danish male actors
Danish film producers
Danish male screenwriters
Danish male film actors
Danish male television actors
People from Langeland Municipality
Danish male actors
Danish expatriates in England